Joseph-Marie Tissier was bishop of Châlons in France from 1912–1948.  He dedicated the ossuary and memorial in Souain-Perthes-lès-Hurlus that holds the remains of 130 members of the French Foreign Legion who died in the Second Battle of Champagne.

References

Year of birth missing
20th-century Roman Catholic bishops in France
Bishops of Châlons-sur-Marne